Hillgrove may refer to:
Hillgrove, California
Hillgrove, New South Wales
Hillgrove, Nova Scotia
Hillgrove High School in Powder Springs, GA
Hillgrove Secondary School in Singapore, Singapore